Dantin is a surname. Notable people with the surname include:

 Louis Dantin (1865–1945), Canadian writer and editor
 Maurice Dantin (died 2012), American attorney and politician
 Michel Dantin (born 1960), French politician